Kateryna Karsak (born December 26, 1985) is a discus thrower from Ukraine.

She finished 4th in the discus final at the 2006 European Athletics Championships in Gothenburg with a throw of 62.45m.
She won the European Under 23 Discus championship in Debrecen, Hungary in July 2007 with a throw of 64.40m.

Competition record

References

1985 births
Ukrainian female discus throwers
Living people
Sportspeople from Odesa
Athletes (track and field) at the 2008 Summer Olympics
Athletes (track and field) at the 2012 Summer Olympics
Olympic athletes of Ukraine
Universiade medalists in athletics (track and field)
Universiade bronze medalists for Ukraine
Medalists at the 2009 Summer Universiade
21st-century Ukrainian women
20th-century Ukrainian women